Tyler Turner (born March 4, 1996) is an American professional soccer player who plays as a defender for the St. Louis Ambush in the Major Arena Soccer League, and outdoors for Iowa Raptors FC in the United Premier Soccer League. Turner is also the head coach for the Iowa Raptors second team playing the Midwest Premier League.

Playing career
On February 27, 2014, Turner signed both a USL Pro contract and an MLS contract with Orlando City SC, making him the youngest player in club history. He made his professional debut on March 22 in a 1–1 draw with the Charleston Battery. Tyler was selected as the club's Rookie of the Year at the conclusion of the 2014 season.

Turner made his MLS regular season debut on March 28, 2015, in a 2–2 draw against Montreal. He started and played all 90 minutes in the contest.

In July 2015, Turner was selected as a member of the MLS Homegrown Team by former USMNT and LA Galaxy player Landon Donovan who served as coach of the Homegrown team.

He was loaned to Orlando City B in March 2016. He became a free agent on November 23, 2016.

Turner was signed by USL side LA Galaxy II on March 16, 2017. His contract option was declined on December 4, 2017.

For the 2018 season, he was on the roster for NPSL side Elm City Express.

In August 2018, Turner signed for Major Arena Soccer League team Orlando SeaWolves.

On February 20, 2019, Birmingham Legion FC of the USL Championship announced they had signed Turner to a multi-year contract.

Turner returned to the MASL in 2021, signing with the Milwaukee Wave.

In September 2022, Turner signed with the St. Louis Ambush on a three-year contract.

International
He played for the United States men's national under-23 soccer team at the 2015 Toulon Tournament. Turner has previously starred for his native country at several other levels, playing for the U-17s, captaining the U-18s and also featuring for the U-20 national team.

Coaching 
On February 1, 2022, Turner was named head coach for the Iowa Raptors FC second team playing in the Midwest Premier League.

References

External links

USSF Development Academy bio
MASL profile

Living people
1996 births
American soccer players
Soccer players from Connecticut
People from Milford, Connecticut
IMG Academy alumni
Association football defenders
Homegrown Players (MLS)
Orlando City SC (2010–2014) players
Orlando City SC players
Orlando City B players
LA Galaxy II players
Orlando SeaWolves players
Birmingham Legion FC players
USL Championship players
Major League Soccer players
National Premier Soccer League players
Major Arena Soccer League players
United States men's youth international soccer players
United States men's under-20 international soccer players
United States men's under-23 international soccer players
2015 CONCACAF U-20 Championship players
Milwaukee Wave players
American soccer coaches
Iowa Raptors FC players
St. Louis Ambush (2013–) players